Don Juan's Reckless Daughter is a 1977 double album by Canadian singer-songwriter Joni Mitchell. Her ninth album, it is unusual for its experimental style, expanding even further on the jazz-influenced sound of Mitchell's previous recordings. Mitchell has stated that, close to completing her contract with Asylum Records, she allowed this album to be looser than anything she had done previously.

Don Juan's Reckless Daughter was released in December 1977 to mixed reviews. It reached No. 25 on the Billboard charts and attained gold record status within three months.

Background and content
Much of the album is experimental: "Overture" is played with six simultaneous guitars, some in different tunings from others, with vocal echo effects; "The Tenth World" is an extended-length instrumental of Latin percussion; "Dreamland" features only percussion and voices (including that of Chaka Khan).

"Paprika Plains" is a 16-minute song played on improvised piano and arranged with a full orchestra; it takes up all of Side 2. In it, Mitchell narrates a first-person description of a late-night gathering in a bar frequented by Indigenous peoples of Canada, touching on themes of hopelessness and alcoholism. At one point in the narrative, the narrator leaves the setting to watch the rain and enters into a dreamstate, and the lyrics – printed in the liner notes but not sung – become a mixture of references to innocent childhood memories, a nuclear explosion and an expressionless tribe gazing upon the dreamer. The narrator returns inside after the rain passes. In speaking to Anthony Fawcett about working on "Paprika Plains", Mitchell said:

The Improvisational, the spontaneous aspect of this creative process – still as a poet – is to set words to the music, which is a hammer and chisel process. Sometimes it flows, but a lot of times it's blocked by concept. And if you're writing free consciousness – which I do once in a while just to remind myself that I can, you know, because I'm fitting little pieces of this puzzle together – the end result must flow as if it was spoken for the first time.

"Off Night Backstreet" was released as a single backed with "Jericho", but did not chart.

Two of the album's songs had previously been released: "Jericho" by Mitchell on her 1974 live album Miles of Aisles and "Dreamland" by Roger McGuinn on his 1976 album Cardiff Rose.

Don Juan's Reckless Daughter featured contributions from prominent jazz musicians, including four members of Weather Report – Jaco Pastorius, Wayne Shorter, Manolo Badrena, and Alex Acuña.

Artwork
The album jacket is a photomontage and includes three photographs of Mitchell. In the foreground she is in blackface as her "reputed alter ego, a black hipster named Art Nouveau".

Track listing

Personnel
Musicians
 Joni Mitchell – vocals, guitars; piano 
 Jaco Pastorius – bass guitar; bongos ; cowbells 
 John Guerin – drums
 Wayne Shorter – soprano saxophone 
 Alex Acuña – congas, cowbell, backing vocals ; shakers ; ankle bells 
 Don Alias – bongos ; congas, claves, backing vocals ; snare drum, sandpaper blocks ; shakers 
 Manolo Badrena – congas, coffee cans, lead vocal ; congas ; credited "in spirit" 
 Airto Moreira – surdo 
 Larry Carlton – electric guitar 
 Michel Colombier – piano 
 Chaka Khan – backing vocals 
 Glenn Frey, J.D. Souther – backing vocals 
 Michael Gibbs – orchestral arrangements and conductor 
 Bobbye Hall – credited "in spirit" 
 El Bwyd – the split-tongued spirit 

Production
Henry Lewy, Steve Katz – production, mixing
Robert Ash – assistant engineer
Frank Laico – orchestra recording
Glen Christensen – art direction
Les Krims – artwork on Ms. Mitchell's dress
Norman Seeff – photography
Keith Williamson – photoprints

Charts

References

Joni Mitchell albums
1977 albums
Asylum Records albums
Albums recorded at A&M Studios
Albums produced by Henry Lewy
Albums produced by Joni Mitchell
Albums recorded at CBS 30th Street Studio